Chase Robert Petty (born April 4, 2003)  is an American professional baseball pitcher in the Cincinnati Reds organization. He was selected by the Minnesota Twins in the first round of the 2021 Major League Baseball draft.

Early life and amateur career
Petty initially grew up in Millville, New Jersey, before his family moved to Somers Point, New Jersey, when he was 14. He attended Mainland Regional High School. He committed to play college baseball at the University of Florida during his sophomore year. As a senior, he was named the New Jersey Gatorade Player of the Year after pitching to a 6-1 win-loss record with a 1.00 earned run average (ERA) and 99 strikeouts in  innings pitched.

Professional career
Petty was selected with the 26th overall pick in the 2021 Major League Baseball draft by the Minnesota Twins. He signed with the team on July 26, 2021, and received a $2.5 million signing bonus.

On March 13, 2022, the Twins traded Petty to the Cincinnati Reds in exchange for Sonny Gray and Francis Peguero. He opened the 2022 season with the Daytona Tortugas. Petty was promoted to the High-A Dayton Dragons after going 0-4 record with a 3.18 ERA and 60 strikeouts in 17 appearances with 12 starts at Daytona.

References

External links

Living people
Baseball players from New Jersey
Baseball pitchers
Mainland Regional High School (New Jersey) alumni
People from Millville, New Jersey
People from Somers Point, New Jersey
Sportspeople from Atlantic County, New Jersey
2003 births
Daytona Tortugas players
Dayton Dragons players